Jang Chul-Woo  (born 5 April 1971) is a South Korean retired footballer who played as a midfielder. He is considered one of the legendary players in Daejeon Citizen.

External links 

1971 births
Living people
Association football midfielders
South Korean footballers
Daejeon Hana Citizen FC players
K League 1 players